The 1976 Campeonato Ecuatoriano de Fútbol de la Serie A was the 18th national championship for football teams in Ecuador.

Teams
The number of teams for this season was played by 12 teams. Carmen Mora and Deportivo Quito promoted as winners of First Stage of Serie B.

First stage

Second stage

Liguilla Final

Second-place play-offs

References

External links
Official website 
 Artículo Oficial de El Nacional Campeón Nacional 1976 en la página web del Diario El Universo
 Línea de Tiempo de eventos y partidos de Liga Deportiva Universitaria
 Calendario de partidos históricos de Liga Deportiva Universitaria
 Sistema de Consulta Interactiva y Herramienta de consulta interactiva de partidos de Liga Deportiva Universitaria

1976
Ecu
Football